This is a list of mobile network operators in South Sudan:

 MTN South Sudan
 Zain South Sudan
 Digitel Telecommunications

Market share
As of 31 December 2020, the market share among South Sudan's mobile telephone operators was as depicted in the table below. At that time South Sudan's population was estimated at approximately 11 million people.

Note:Totals may be slightly off due to rounding.

See also
 Telecommunications in South Sudan

References

External links
MTN announces leadership changes As of 16 January 2020.

Juba
 
South Sudan communications-related lists
Lists of companies of South Sudan